The Third Legislative Assembly of Delhi was constituted in 2003 after Delhi Legislative Assembly election held on 1 December 2003.

Election and Government formation
Total six national parties, twelve state parties, forty-five registered (unrecognized) parties and other independent candidates contested for 70 assembly seats. With 47 seats, INC emerged as the single largest party and formed the Government with Sheila Dikshit as the Chief Minister. BJP won 20 seats and secured second position. JD(S), NCP and Independent contestant each won one seat.

Electors

Candidates

Elected members

List of members
Default sort, in ascending order of constituency

References 

Indian politics articles by importance
Delhi Legislative Assembly